Sports in Louisville, Kentucky include amateur and professional sports in baseball, football, basketball, horse racing, horse shows, ice hockey, soccer and lacrosse. The city of Louisville and the Louisville metropolitan area have a sporting history from the mid-19th century to the present day.

Professional sports
Louisville is now home to two minor-league professional men's teams, and one major-league professional women's team. The Louisville Bats are a baseball team playing in the Triple-A East as the Class AAA affiliate of the Cincinnati Reds. The team plays at Louisville Slugger Field at the edge of the city's downtown.

Louisville hosts two soccer teams. Louisville City FC began play in the United Soccer League in 2015, sharing Louisville Slugger Field with the Bats. Louisville City was the reserve side for Major League Soccer's Orlando City SC in 2015, but no longer fills that role after Orlando City launched a team-owned reserve side for the 2016 season.

In October 2019, the National Women's Soccer League announced that it would award an expansion franchise to Louisville that would begin play at Lynn Family Stadium in 2021.

College sports
College basketball and college football are very popular in Louisville, which prides itself on being one of the best college sports towns in America.

The city is home to the University of Louisville Cardinals, who compete in the NCAA's Division I and are a member of the Atlantic Coast Conference. The U of L men's basketball team won the NCAA Division I basketball championship in 1980 and 1986 under head coach Denny Crum, and recently achieved the NCAA Final Four in 2005, 2012, and 2013 under head coach Rick Pitino, and winning the National Championship in 2013 which would later be vacated. The women's basketball team, under head coach Jeff Walz, reached the final of the NCAA women's tournament in 2009 and 2013, losing both times to Connecticut. The 2008–09 team featured 2009 WNBA Draft #1 pick Angel McCoughtry. Both basketball teams ended their tenure at Freedom Hall in 2010 and moved to the new KFC Yum! Center in downtown Louisville for the 2010–11 season.

The U of L football team, with coach Bobby Petrino, finished No. 7 in the nation for the 2006 season, 19th in the final BCS rankings of 2005 and 10th in 2004. After winning the Orange Bowl—the school's first Bowl Championship Series game—in January 2007, Petrino left the Cardinals to be the head coach of the Atlanta Falcons. Steve Kragthorpe was hired to replace Petrino less than two days later. Kragthorpe was fired after three years and replaced by University of Florida defensive coordinator Charlie Strong. Petrino returned for a second stint with the Cardinals in 2014, after Strong left for the head coaching vacancy at Texas. The U of L football team plays on campus at Cardinal Stadium. U of L won the Allstate Sugar Bowl in 2013, upsetting the Florida Gators.

The U of L baseball team advanced to the 2007 and 2013 College World Series in Omaha, where eight teams competed for the national championship.  In 2012–13, U of L became the first school ever to appear in a BCS bowl game, the men's and women's Final Fours in basketball, and the College World Series in the same school year.

Bellarmine University, home of the Knights, moved all sports up to the NCAA Division I level in the 2019–2020 academic year. Spalding University, home of the Golden Eagles, plays in NCAA Division III as members of the St. Louis Intercollegiate Athletic Conference.

Horse racing and equestrian events
Churchill Downs is home to the Kentucky Derby, the largest sports event in the state, as well as the Kentucky Oaks, which together cap the two-week-long Kentucky Derby Festival. Churchill Downs has also hosted the renowned Breeders' Cup on eight occasions, in 2011, and most recently in 2018.

Besides racing there is the World's Championship Horse show. This show is mostly for Saddlebred horses and is held in conjunction with the Kentucky State Fair. This is the premier event of the year for Saddle seat Pleasure and Equitation.

Louisville is also the home of Valhalla Golf Club which hosted the 1996, 2000, and 2014 PGA Championships, and hosted the 2008 Ryder Cup. It is also home to one of the top skateparks in the U.S., David Armstrong Extreme Park.

Louisville is also the home of Ohio Valley Wrestling, a professional wrestling promotion that at different times served as the official developmental territory for WWE (2000–2008) and TNA Wrestling (2011–2013). Many notable WWE performers trained in OVW, such as Jillian Hall, Randy Orton, John Cena, Batista, CM Punk, and The Spirit Squad (which included the wrestler now known as Dolph Ziggler).

High school
High school sports are also very popular in the city, especially football and basketball.

Louisville area high schools have been dominant in football in recent years. Trinity (1994, 2001–2003, 2005–2008, 2010–2013), Male (1993, 1998, 2000, 2015) and St. Xavier (1992, 1995, 1997, 1999, 2004, 2009) high schools have won 22 of the 24 football titles in Kentucky's largest enrollment class (4A through 2006, 6A since 2007) since 1992. Central has won five 3A titles since Kentucky's move to a six-class system (2007, 2008, 2010–2012). Manual also has a storied history, collecting 5 state titles (1925, 1938, 1948, 1959, 1966) and 2 national titles (1925 and 1938). Manual and Male are the oldest high schools in Louisville, and the 1st football game in the state was played between these two in 1893. Also, Trinity and St. Xavier have one of the fiercest rivalries in high school football. Every year, the Trinity-St. Xavier game draws an average of 35,000 fans to Cardinal Stadium, and is promoted by the schools as the largest attended regular-season high school football game in the country. Currently, St. Xavier leads this storied rivalry with 31 wins, 26 losses and 2 ties.

The 2002 Kentucky state 4A Football Championship between Male and Trinity, a showdown between future UofL teammates Brian Brohm (Trinity) and Michael Bush (Male) that ended with a 59–56 Trinity win, is listed as one of the top 50 sporting events of all time by many critics. The "Old Rivalry" between Male and Manual high schools is one of the nation's oldest, dating back to 1893, and was played on Thanksgiving Day through 1980, with Manual winning the final T-Day game by a score of 6–0 in overtime.

Annual competitions
From 2007 to 2019, Louisville was host to the annual Ironman Louisville triathlon, in August until 2014 then in October afterwards. In 2019, 2,366 participants finished the course.

In early 2012, Louisville became the first American city to ever host the UCI Masters Cyclocross World Championships, and the following year became the first American city to host the Masters, Juniors, U23, and Professional Elite Women's and Men's UCI Cyclo-cross World Championships, the biggest races of the fastest growing form of bicycle racing. The event was held at a new permanent cyclocross course at Eva Bandman Park.

Historical teams
Louisville long ago hosted teams in the National Football League and Major League Baseball and fielded a strong franchise, the Kentucky Colonels, in the American Basketball Association before the ABA–NBA merger in June 1976.  The Colonels won the penultimate ABA championship in 1975, defeating their archrival, the Indiana Pacers, in the 1975 ABA Finals.

The Kentucky Colonels were the winningest team in the history of the American Basketball Association, but the Colonels were not included in the ABA–NBA merger in June 1976. A later team with the same name played in Louisville in the ABA 2000 league but moved to Murray, Kentucky in 2007 before folding. Louisville and the corporate community had also attempted to pursue the Vancouver Grizzlies franchise before their ultimate move to Memphis in 2001, as well as the Charlotte Hornets franchise, which ultimately moved to New Orleans in 2002 but was revived in 2004 as the Charlotte Bobcats, regaining the Hornets name and the team's pre-relocation history in 2014.

Another soccer team, the Louisville Lightning, played indoor soccer in the Professional Arena Soccer League from 2009 to 2012 before folding.
The city was home to two professional ice hockey teams in the East Coast Hockey League, from 1990 to 1994 the Louisville Icehawks, followed by the Louisville RiverFrogs from 1995 to 1998. The city also had an American Hockey League team from 1999 to 2001, the Louisville Panthers.

See also
 Sports in Kentucky

References

External links
 Louisville Sports Commission